Isabella, also known as Benson or Bensen, is an unincorporated community in Chilton County, Alabama, United States. Isabella is home to Isabella High School. The community is centered on the school, as Isabella was never a center of trade or professional services.

References

Unincorporated communities in Chilton County, Alabama
Unincorporated communities in Alabama